"No One to Depend On" is a song by Latin rock band Santana, from their 1971 album, Santana III. The main melody of the song is taken from "Spanish Grease", first recorded by Willie Bobo in 1965.
It was written by Mike Carabello, Coke Escovedo, and Gregg Rolie.

Background
It is the second track on the first side of the LP album and was released as its second single. The song is very instrumentally based, with numerous bass and guitar riffs and a long instrumental introduction. The vocals start after 56 seconds. At the start of the song, a man can be heard saying something in Spanish. It is commonly believed to be the Spanish phrase, "Salpica Micaela," said by José "Chepito" Areas himself to the other musicians about the style (rhythm or "feel") to play the song.  The song is famous for its "call and response" passage between the guitar and the bass.

In a 50-year retrospective on the album and the song No One to Depend On, Glide Magazine opined;

Chart performance
The single spent nine weeks on the Billboard Hot 100, and peaked at #36. In Canada it reached no. 17 in the RPM Magazine charts.

Popular culture
A live version of the song features on the 2009 videogame, Guitar Hero 5, in which Carlos Santana himself is a guest character.

References

1971 songs
Columbia Records singles
Santana (band) songs